Yuriy Lopatynsky nom de guerre Sheyk and Kalyna (born December 1906 in L’viv, died 1982) was a Ukrainian activist, soldier and a colonel in the Ukrainian Insurgent Army.

Son of a Greek Catholic priest, and a school colleague of Roman Shukhevych. He was an active member of Ukrainian Military Organization (UVO) and Organization of Ukrainian Nationalists (OUN). During World War II, he was a member of the Nachtigall Battalion headquarters (since 1941). As a representative of Ukrainian Supreme Liberation Council (UHVR), he took part in Polish-Ukrainian talks, between Polish Home Army (AK) and Ukrainian Insurgent Army (UPA) in 1945. After World War II, he emigrated to the United States.

References

 
 

1906 births
1982 deaths
People from the Kingdom of Galicia and Lodomeria
Organization of Ukrainian Nationalists politicians
Soviet emigrants to the United States
Ukrainian nationalists